The Fall River is a tributary of the Deschutes River in the Deschutes National Forest in Deschutes County, Oregon, United States. Fly fishing is permitted.

There is a trail along the river, and also a campground about one mile downstream from the head of the river; a guard station at the head of the river can be rented.

Fall River Falls is on the river within La Pine State Park.

The Fall River also hosts the Fall River Hatchery, a state-run fish hatchery which raises rainbow trout, brook trout and cutthroat trout fingerling for stocking programs throughout the state.      The river has one named tributary, Indian Creek, which enters from the left above the hatchery.

See also
 List of rivers of Oregon

References

External links
 Photo of the Fall River in winter from Wikimedia Commons

Rivers of Oregon
Rivers of Deschutes County, Oregon
Deschutes National Forest